The Caroline Mark Home is a historic retirement home located at 222 East Lincoln Street in Mount Carroll, Illinois. The home was built in 1906 through an endowment made in Caroline Mark's estate. Mark, who died in 1900, and her husband James were longtime Mount Carroll residents; as James was president of the city's First National Bank, the two were quite wealthy. Mark bequeathed her estate to provide housing for the area's elderly women, who were often poor and had little to no social support. The home was built and operated using the funds from her estate and is still funded by the income provided by Mark's real estate holdings. The building has a Craftsman design with buttered masonry joints, corbelled brickwork, and reinforced concrete floors to provide long-term structural integrity.

The home was added to the National Register of Historic Places on August 11, 1983.

References

External links
Caroline Mark Home

Residential buildings on the National Register of Historic Places in Illinois
Houses completed in 1906
American Craftsman architecture in Illinois
Buildings and structures in Carroll County, Illinois
National Register of Historic Places in Carroll County, Illinois
1906 establishments in Illinois